Christ's Sake is an American Christian hardcore and Christian rock band, and they primarily play hardcore punk, punk rock, and alternative rock. They come from Huntington Beach, California. The band started making music in 2011, and their members are lead vocalist, Dillon Hendren, vocalist and lead guitarist, Lance Hendren, background vocalist, Sandra Calvillo, bassist, Matt Vangalapudi, and drummer, Vinny. Their first studio album, Christ's Sake, was released in 2012 by Thumper Punk Records. The subsequent studio album, We All Fall Down, was released by Thumper Punk Records, in 2014.

Background
Christ's Sake is a Christian hardcore and Christian rock band from Huntington Beach, California. Their members are lead vocalist, Dillon Hendren, vocalist and lead guitarist, Lance Hendren, lead guitarist, Matt Killian, background vocalist, Sandra Calvillo, bassist, Matt Vangalapudi, and drummer, Vinnie.

Music history
The band commenced as a musical entity in 2011 with their release, Christ's Sake, a studio album, that was released by Thumper Punk Records on October 27, 2012. Their subsequent studio album, We All Fall Down, was released on July 23, 2014 by Thumper Punk Records.

Members
 Current members
 Dillon Hendren - lead vocals
 Lance Hendren - lead guitar, vocals
 Sandra Calvillo - background vocals
 Matt Vangalapudi - bass
 Vinny Morales - drums

Discography
 Studio albums
 Christ's Sake (October 27, 2012, Thumper Punk)
 We All Fall Down (July 23, 2014, Thumper Punk)

References

External links

 Facebook page

Musical groups from California
2011 establishments in California
Musical groups established in 2011